Royal Park Psychiatric Hospital, commonly known as Royal Park is a former Receiving House and Psychiatric Hospital located in Parkville.   Operating for over 90 years, Royal Park Hospital was the first psychiatric hospital established in Victoria after the Lunacy Act of 1903, and was intended for patients with curable disorders. Built on the north-western edge of the 181 hectare parklands known as Royal Park, Royal Park Hospital along with Royal Melbourne Hospital, Royal Children's Hospital and Mount Royal formed the Parkville Hospital Precinct.   Following the hospital's closure in the 1990s, several of the hospital's original buildings have been listed on the Victorian Heritage Register for their historic and architectural values.

Construction and design
The hospital buildings were designed by architect SE Bindley of the Public Works Department in a Queen Anne style.  Constructed between 1906 and 1913, the buildings were mostly made of red brick and were surrounded by verandahs.  Separate buildings were made for males and females, and for acute and convalescent patients.

History
Royal Park opened as a Receiving House in September 1907. Receiving Houses were used to provide accommodation for those patients who required only short term diagnosis and treatment. No person was to be detained in a receiving house for more than two months in any event. Patients diagnosed as insane were transferred to a Hospital for the Insane such as Kew Asylum or Yarra Bend Asylum by order of the Superintendent of the Receiving House.  Following the completion of some of the hospital wards, Royal Park was gazetted as a Receiving House and a Hospital for the Insane on 7 April 1909.

Since its establishment the title of Royal Park Hospital has been altered to reflect both the community's changing attitude towards mental illness and the Victorian Government's approach to the treatment of mentally ill persons. The Mental Hygiene Act 1933 (No.4157, proclaimed 14/2/1934) altered the title from "Royal Park Hospital for the Insane" to "Royal Park Mental Hospital".  Up until 1954 Royal Park functioned as a mental hospital for long term patients and a receiving house for short term patients. In April 1954 Royal Park's function as a Mental Hospital was revoked, published in the Government Gazette on 7 April 1954. From 1954 Royal Park functioned as a hospital providing short term diagnosis and accommodation only. The Mental Health Act 1959 (No.6605, operational since 1962) changed the title of "Receiving House" to "Psychiatric Hospital".

A special Military Mental Hospital was opened at Royal Park in 1915. The date range of this hospital is unknown.

Closure and redevelopment
As a consequence of the Victorian Government's policy of deinstitutionalisation, Royal Park Hospital was decommissioned in the 1990s.  The old Receiving House has been home to the Early Psychosis Prevention and Intervention Centre (EPPIC) since the mid-1990s. Renamed Orygen Youth Health incorporating the EPPIC program. Orygen Youth Health is part of NorthWestern Mental Health which is itself part of Melbourne Health.  After the closure of the Royal Park Psychiatric Hospital, inpatient psychiatric services were transferred to the new John Cade Building at RMH City Campus, under the umbrella of NorthWestern Mental Health.

A number of the original hospital buildings were listed on the Victorian Heritage Register (H2606) and were restored and redeveloped as part of the Commonwealth Games Village for the 2006 Melbourne Commonwealth Games.

See also
 List of Australian psychiatric institutions
 John Cade
 Kew Lunatic Asylum
 Kew Cottages

References

Hospitals in Melbourne
Psychiatric hospitals in Australia
Defunct hospitals in Victoria (Australia)
History of Melbourne
Hospital buildings completed in 1914
Hospitals established in 1907
1907 establishments in Australia
Hospitals disestablished in 1999
1999 disestablishments in Australia
Organisations based in Australia with royal patronage
Heritage sites in Melbourne
Buildings and structures in the City of Melbourne (LGA)